Hans von Arnim (14 September 1859, Groß Fredenwalde – 26 May 1931, Vienna) was a German-Austrian classical philologist, who specialized in studies of Plato and Aristotle.

He studied classical philology at the University of Greifswald as a pupil of Ulrich von Wilamowitz-Moellendorf. From 1881 to 1888 he worked as a schoolteacher in Elberfeld and Bonn, then obtained his habilitation in 1888 from the University of Halle. In 1893 he became a full professor at Rostock, then in 1900 was appointed chair of Greek philology at the University of Vienna as a successor to Theodor Gomperz. In 1914 he relocated as a professor to the newly founded University of Frankfurt, and in 1921 returned to the University of Vienna.

He was elected a foreign member of the Royal Netherlands Academy of Arts and Sciences in 1919.

Selected works 
 Stoicorum Veterum Fragmenta. 4 volumes, Leipzig 1903–05, 1924 – Fragments of the ancient Stoics. (Volume IV, 1924 : index, Maximilian Adler).
 Sprachliche Forschungen zur Chronologie der Platonischen Dialoge, 1912 – Linguistic research on the chronology of the Platonic dialogues.
 Platos Jugenddialoge und die Entstehungszeit des Phaidros, 1914 – Plato's "youth dialogues" and the origin of Phaedrus.
 Xenophons Memorabilien und Apologie des Sokrates, 1923 – Xenophon's "Memorabilia" and "Apology" (Socratic dialogues).
 Die drei aristotelischen Ethiken, 1924 – The three Aristotelian ethics.
 Zur Entstehungsgeschichte der aristotelischen Politik, 1924 – On the origin of Aristotelian politics.
 Die Entstehung der Gotteslehre des Aristoteles, 1931 – The emergence of Aristotle's doctrine of God.
 Zwölf Tragödien des Euripides, 2 volumes 1931 (edition of 12 tragedies by Euripides).

References 

1859 births
1931 deaths
People from Uckermark (district)
People from the Province of Brandenburg
Hans
German classical philologists
University of Greifswald alumni
Academic staff of the University of Rostock
Academic staff of the University of Vienna
Academic staff of Goethe University Frankfurt
Members of the Royal Netherlands Academy of Arts and Sciences